Farmers and Merchants Bank, also known as Geneva Savings Bank, is a historic bank building located at Geneva in Ontario County, New York. It was constructed in 1914–1915 and is a -story, three-bay brick building with a cast stone facade.  The facade embodies a full range of Neoclassical features derived from ancient Greek architecture that were meant to convey a sense of integrity, durability, and reliability to the venerable financial institution of public banking.

It was listed on the National Register of Historic Places in 2008. It is located in the Geneva Commercial Historic District.

References

Bank buildings on the National Register of Historic Places in New York (state)
Neoclassical architecture in New York (state)
Commercial buildings completed in 1915
Buildings and structures in Ontario County, New York
Geneva, New York
National Register of Historic Places in Ontario County, New York
Historic district contributing properties in New York (state)